Frederique Overdijk (born 12 April 2000) is a Dutch cricketer. Overdijk made her international debut for the Netherlands' women's cricket team in August 2019.

Career
In August 2019, Overdijk was named in the Dutch Women's Twenty20 International (WT20I) squad for the 2019 Netherlands Women's Quadrangular Series. Overdijk made her WT20I debut for the Netherlands, against Ireland, on 8 August 2019. Later the same month, Overdijk was named in the Dutch squad for the 2019 ICC Women's World Twenty20 Qualifier tournament in Scotland.

In August 2021, Overdijk was named in the Dutch squad for the 2021 ICC Women's T20 World Cup Europe Qualifier. In the Netherlands' second match of the tournament, against France, Overdijk became the first bowler, male or female, to take seven wickets in a T20I match, taking seven wickets for three runs in the four overs she bowled. Her record breaking figures were equalled in October 2022, by Alison Stocks for Argentina against Peru.

In October 2021, she was named in the Dutch team for the 2021 Women's Cricket World Cup Qualifier tournament in Zimbabwe.

References

External links
 
 

2000 births
Living people
Dutch women cricketers
Netherlands women One Day International cricketers
Netherlands women Twenty20 International cricketers
Place of birth missing (living people)
21st-century Dutch women